Adsit House was a historic house located at 34 Main Street in Hornell, Steuben County, New York.

Description and history 
It was a two-story, L-shaped brick dwelling constructed in stages between 1828 and 1880. The original section constructed in 1828 was a two-story, three-bay brick residence in the Federal style, the first brick structure in Hornell.

It was listed on the National Register of Historic Places on February 20, 2003.

The house was demolished on June 15, 2010. Hornell residents had mixed emotions about the historic house being razed.

References

Houses on the National Register of Historic Places in New York (state)
Federal architecture in New York (state)
Houses completed in 1880
Houses in Steuben County, New York
National Register of Historic Places in Steuben County, New York
Hornell, New York